Yang Chao-hsun is a Taiwanese footballer who plays as a defender.

References

External links
 

Living people
1987 births
Taiwanese footballers
Chinese Taipei international footballers
Association football defenders